The A.J. Andrus Duplex, also known as the Paul Pritchard Duplex, is a historic building located in Mason City, Iowa, United States. The two story structure was completed in 1921 in the Prairie School style.  Its most distinguishing feature is its C-shaped plan.  The exterior is composed of brick on the first floor and stucco on the second floor.  The duplex has a horizontal emphasis about it with a broad, overhanging hipped roof, and bands of windows. It was listed on the National Register of Historic Places in 1980.

References

Houses completed in 1921
Prairie School architecture in Iowa
Houses in Mason City, Iowa
National Register of Historic Places in Mason City, Iowa
Houses on the National Register of Historic Places in Iowa